USCGC Mackinac has been the name of more than one United States Revenue Cutter Service and United States Coast Guard ship, and may refer to:

 , a patrol boat which served in the Revenue Cutter Service from 1903 to 1915 and in the Coast Guard (as USCGC Mackinac) from 1915 to 1917 and from 1919 to 1939
 , later WHEC-371, a cutter in commission from 1949 to 1967

See also

Ships of the United States Revenue Cutter Service
United States Coast Guard ship names